The 2021–22 ACB season, also known as Liga Endesa for sponsorship reasons, was the 39th season of the top Spanish professional basketball league, since its establishment in 1983. It started on 18 September 2021 with the first round of the regular season and ended on 19 June 2022 with the finals.

Barça was the defending champion which lost the final series 1–3 to Real Madrid which reclaimed a record 36th Spanish title and their 14th ACB title ending a 3-year drought after their last triumph in 2019.

Teams

Promotion and relegation (pre-season) 
A total of 18 teams contested the league, including 17 sides from the 2020–21 season and one promoted from the 2020–21 LEB Oro.

Team promoted from LEB Oro
Río Breogán

Teams relegated to LEB Oro
Movistar Estudiantes
Acunsa GBC

Venues and locations

Personnel and sponsorship

Managerial changes

Regular season

League table

Results

Playoffs

Final standings

Attendances to arenas

Restrictions 
In response to the COVID-19 pandemic, clubs were not allowed to use the total capacity of their arenas. According to the progress of the pandemic, the capacity allowed each month was decided by the Government of Spain, in agreement with the Autonomous Communities.
September: 40% of capacity allowed. Additionally, Catalonia reduced it to 30%.
October to December: 80% of capacity allowed, except for Catalonia and Basque Country, whose Governments limited initially the attendance to 30% and 40%, respectively. On October 5, 2021, Basque Country increased the capacity allowed to 80%. On October 15, 2021, Catalonia increased the capacity allowed to 80%.
January: 50% of capacity allowed.
February: 75% of capacity allowed.
March to June: 100% of capacity allowed.

Average attendances

Awards 
All official awards of the 2021–22 ACB season.

MVP 

Source:

Finals MVP 

Source:

All-ACB Teams 

Source:

Best Young Player Award 

Source:

Best All-Young Team 

Source:

Best Defender Award 

Source:

Player of the round 

Source:

Player of the month 

Source:

ACB clubs in international competitions

Notes

References

External links 
 Official website 

 
ACB
Spanish
Liga ACB seasons